de Lucas, deLucas, DeLucas or variants thereof may refer to:

 Ángel Javier Arizmendi de Lucas (born 1984), Spanish soccer player
 Enrique de Lucas (born 1978), Spanish soccer player
 Ernesto de Lucas Hopkins (born 1976), Mexican politician
 Lawrence J. DeLucas (born 1950), U.S. astronaut and biochemist
 Pablo de Lucas (born 1986), Spanish soccer player

See also 
 De Luca (surname)
 Lucas (disambiguation)

Spanish-language surnames